Hoda Saad (born November 22, 1981) is a Moroccan singer-songwriter. She was contracted to Rotana Records after appearing on The X Factor, XSeer Al Najah in 2006, releasing a first album in 2008, and the second in 2011.

Early life 
She comes from an artistic family who supported her since her early age to do a musical career, so she entered into a conservatory at the age of 12. Her voice and her face allowed her to be noticed and she took part of a Moroccan singing competition "Noujoum El Ghad", produced by the local channel 2M, in which she arrived third. Wishing to diverse her talent, she flew to Switzerland in Geneva and studied at the "Institut supérieur de musique", in which she learned the basics of Western music.

Career 

In 2006, she took part of the Arabic version of The X-Factor, produced by Rotana, in which was also discovered fellow Moroccan Rajaa Kasabni (which eventually won). Hoda got eliminated quickly by Egyptian singer and judge Nelly Artin Kalfayan, but her voice got the attention of Rotana's CEO Salim El Hindi, which invited her to join the label. She released her first album, "Ertaht" in 2008, which features songs in various dialects, from her native Moroccan dialect to Lebanese, Egyptian and Gulf. Three singles were released from the album and turned into video clip, two Egyptian songs "Ma Saddaq" and "Ma Kountesh", and the Moroccan song "Ma Tfakarnish" which she wrote and composed herself. It is very rare indeed that Moroccan artists release singles in the Moroccan dialect due to the fact that it is very hard to get for middle-easterns.  But the single was a good success, due to the efficient promotion from Rotana, and Hoda was showcased in many scenes and television shows across the Middle-East.

She sang a duet with Iraqi singer Majid El Muhandes titled "Ala Bali" and released another successful single in Moroccan dialect, "Bghito Walla Krehto" which she also wrote and composed. The clip was shot in Turkey by a French video director. The single was later included in her second album titled "Tayr El Hob", released in 2011 and produced by Rotana. This album is a premiere in the Middle-East as being the first album entirely performed in the Moroccan dialect. Hoda wrote and composed all the songs and recorded the songs in studios in United Kingdom, Lebanon and Egypt. A second single from the album was released into a video clip, the main single "Tayr El Hob" in January 2012. Hoda Saad wrote songs for other Moroccan singers such as Asmaa Lamnawar, Tahra Hamamish or Leila Gouchi and even wrote and composed a song for the great Syrian singer Assala Nasri's upcoming album.

Albums 

Ertaht (2009), produced by Rotana

 "Ma Kontesh" – (Egyptian Arabic)
 "Ma Saddaq" – (Egyptian Arabic)
 "Maghroumi Feek" – (Lebanese Arabic)
 "Abu El Aarif" – (Egyptian Arabic)
 "Jeet Nsaydo wa Sayadni" – (Moroccan Arabic)
 "Ma Tfakarnish" – (Moroccan Arabic)
 "Ma Baddak" – (Lebanese Arabic)
 "Ertaht" – (Egyptian Arabic)
 "Allah Yestar" – (Gulf Arabic)
 "Tameni Aleik" – (Egyptian Arabic)

Tayr El Hob (2011), produced by Rotana

 "Tayr El Hob" – (Moroccan Arabic)
 "El Nass" – (Moroccan Arabic)
 "Mohima Rasmiya" – (Moroccan Arabic)
 "El Ashra" – (Moroccan Arabic)
 "Shafok M'aha" -(Moroccan Arabic)
 "Nari" – (Moroccan Arabic)
 "Leili Nahari" – (Moroccan Arabic)
 "Bghito Walla Krehto" – (Moroccan Arabic)
 "Nhawel Ensa" – (Moroccan Arabic)
 "Mazal Nebghik" – (Moroccan Arabic)
 "Mreeda" – (Moroccan Arabic)

Videoclips 
"Ma Saddaq" (2008) directed by Fadi Haddad
"Ma Tfakarnish" (2009) directed by Waleed Nassif
"Ma Kountesh" (2009) directed by Waleed Nassif
"Bghito Walla Krehto" (2010) directed by Fabien Dufils
"Tayr El Hob" (2012) directed by Randa Alam

References

External link

1982 births
Rotana Records artists
People from Casablanca
Living people
21st-century Moroccan women singers